DeAndre Houston-Carson (born April 13, 1993) is an American football safety for the Chicago Bears of the National Football League (NFL). He played college football at William & Mary.

Professional career

Houston-Carson was selected in the sixth round, 185th overall by the Chicago Bears in the 2016 NFL Draft. On May 9, 2016, he signed a four-year contract with the Bears.

On September 2, 2017, Houston-Carson was waived by the Bears and was signed to the practice squad. He was promoted to the active roster on September 19, 2017.

After becoming a free agent following the 2018 season, he was re-signed by the Bears to a one-year deal on March 29, 2019. During the 2019 season, Houston-Carson played every game as he recorded six tackles on special teams, the third-most on the team.

On March 31, 2020, Houston-Carson was re-signed by the Bears. 
In Week 5 against the Tampa Bay Buccaneers on Thursday Night Football, Houston–Carson broke up a pass thrown by Tom Brady on fourth down with less than a minute left in the game to help secure a 20–19 Bears' win. In the following week's game, he intercepted a pass thrown by Teddy Bridgewater of the Carolina Panthers with 1:32 remaining in the game to seal the 23–16 Bears' victory.

Houston-Carson signed another one-year contract with the Bears on March 25, 2021. He suffered a fractured forearm in Week 14 and was placed on season-ending injured reserve on December 13, 2021.

On March 20, 2022, Houston-Carson re-signed with the Bears.

References

External links
Chicago Bears bio
William & Mary Tribe bio

1993 births
Living people
Players of American football from Virginia
American football safeties
William & Mary Tribe football players
Chicago Bears players
People from Caroline County, Virginia